Patriarch Peter I may refer to:

 Patriarch Peter I of Alexandria, Greek Patriarch of Alexandria in 300–311
 Peter of Constantinople, Patriarch of Constantinople in 654–666